is a successful racing driver in the Japanese Touring Car Championship and F3000, as well as regular presenter on the Japanese motoring show Best Motoring. Nakaya offered a distinctively analytical approach to reviewing cars on the show, providing detailed analyses of various vehicle components and explaining certain driving styles that were best suited to their characteristics. He was a regular driver of Mitsubishi Lancer Evolutions during Best Motoring races involving the I, II, III, IV, V, VI (including the Tommi Makinen Edition), VII, and VIII of the car, often recording lap times significantly quicker than other drivers of the same vehicle.

Nakaya's name was applied to a special preface-build of the Mitsubishi FTO, the Nakaya-Tune FTO, which appeared in 1997.

Nakaya was considered for a Formula One ride with Brabham in 1992, but the FIA would not grant him a superlicense on the grounds that Japanese F3000 (today the Super Formula Championship) was, at the time, not considered a stepping stone to F1. The ride eventually went to Giovanna Amati, who was more known for her wealth than talent and was replaced three races into the season by future World Champion Damon Hill.

Career results

Complete World Touring Car Championship results
(key) (Races in bold indicate pole position) (Races in italics indicate fastest lap)

† Not eligible for series points

Complete Japanese Formula 3 results
(key) (Races in bold indicate pole position) (Races in italics indicate fastest lap)

Japanese Formula 3000 Championship results
(key) (Races in bold indicate pole position) (Races in italics indicate fastest lap)

Complete Japanese Touring Car Championship (-1993) results

Complete Japanese Touring Car Championship (1994-) results

Complete All-Japan GT Championship results 
(key)

Complete Bathurst 1000 results

Complete 24 Hours of Le Mans results

References

1957 births
Living people
Japanese racing drivers
Japanese Touring Car Championship drivers
Asian Le Mans Series drivers
24 Hours of Le Mans drivers

Japanese Formula 3 Championship drivers
Long Distance Series drivers
Nakajima Racing drivers
Nürburgring 24 Hours drivers